= Kandli =

Coordinates: 15.14°N 74.84°E

- Village
- Interactive map of Kandli
- Country: India
- State: Karnataka
- District: Dharwad

Government
  - Type: Panchayat raj
  - Body: Village Panchayat

Population (2011)
  - Total: 449

Languages
  - Official: Kannada
- Time zone: UTC+5:30 (IST)
- ISO 3166 code: IN-KA
- Vehicle registration: KA
- Website: karnataka.gov.in

Kandli is a village in Dharwad district of Karnataka, India.

== Demographics ==
As of the 2011 Census of India there were 95 households in Kandli and a total population of 449 consisting of 237 males and 212 females. There were 65 children ages 0–6.
